is a Japanese comedian, tarento and actress who is a member of the comedy duo Oasiz.

Filmography

TV series

Current appearances

Former appearances

Drama

Other TV series

Advertisements

Radio series

Films

References

External links
 

Japanese actresses
Japanese women comedians
1971 births
Living people
People from Tahara, Aichi
Actors from Aichi Prefecture